Strictly Come Dancing returned for its eighth series on BBC One with a red carpet launch show on 11 September 2010, and the competitive live shows began on 1 October. The series concluded on 18 December when Kara Tointon and Artem Chigvintsev won the competition. According to BARB data, this series was the consistently highest rated of the show to date, peaking at 14.28 million viewers. Len Goodman, Bruno Tonioli, Craig Revel Horwood and Alesha Dixon returned as judges.

Five professional dancers from the last series didn't return for this series, Matthew Cutler, Brian Fortuna, Ian Waite and married Darren Bennett and Lilia Kopylova. Three male professionals joined this years series, Artem Chigvintsev, Robin Windsor and Jared Murillo. For series 8 the set has been totally revamped to try to attract more viewers to the programme, the backstage room where scores were given has been replaced by a tower above the dancefloor so the couples can watch as their teammates perform (much like the so-called 'celebriquarium' on the American version of the programme). In week 8 of the competition the live show was transmitted from the Blackpool Tower Ballroom.

Bruce Forsyth and Tess Daly returned to present the main show on BBC One. For the results show, Daly is joined by Strictly Come Dancing: It Takes Two presenter Claudia Winkleman.

The celebrities did not know their professional partners until they were introduced to each other at the launch show. At the age of 61, Pamela Stephenson became the oldest contestant to ever make it to the finale.

Couples

Scoring chart

Average chart 

This table only counts for dances scored on a traditional 40 points scale (the scores for the swing-a-thon are not included).

Highest and lowest scoring performances of the series 
The best and worst performances in each dance according to the judges' marks are as follows:

Couples highest and lowest scoring dances

Weekly scores and songs 
Unless indicated otherwise, individual judges scores in the charts below (given in parentheses) are listed in this order from left to right: Craig Revel Horwood, Len Goodman, Alesha Dixon, Bruno Tonioli.

Week 1

Night 1 – Friday 

Running order

Night 2 – Saturday 

 Musical guest: Robbie Williams and Gary Barlow—"Shame"
Running order

Week 2 

 Musical guest: Robbie Williams—"Rock DJ"
Running order

Week 3 

 Musical guest: Peter Andre—"Defender"
Running order

* Tina O'Brien was unable to perform due to illness. Under the rules of the show, she was granted a "bye" to the following week.

Week 4 

 Musical guest: Neil Diamond—"Midnight Train to Georgia"
Running order

* Ian Waite standing in for Brendan Cole who was away attending his father's funeral.

Week 5: Halloween Week 

 Musical guest: Alice Cooper—"Poison"
Running order

Week 6 

 Musical guest: Bryan Ferry—"You Can Dance"
Running order

Week 7 

 Musical guest: Annie Lennox—"Universal Child"; Alesha Dixon—"Radio"
Running order

Week 8: Blackpool Week 

 Musical guest: Viva Elvis—"Blue Suede Shoes"; Duffy—"Well, Well, Well"
Running order

Week 9 

 Musical guest: James Blunt—"So Far Gone"
Running order

Week 10: Movie Night (Quarter-final) 

Running order

Week 11: Semi-final 

Night 1

Running order

Night 2
 Musical guest Take That—"The Flood" and "Back For Good"; Bruce Forsyth & Lance Ellington—"The Three Little Bears"

Running order

Week 12: Final

Show 1 

Running order

Show 2 

Running order

Dance chart 

 Highest scoring dance
 Lowest scoring dance
 Not performed due to illness

Week 1: Waltz or Cha-Cha-Cha
Week 2: Foxtrot or Salsa
Week 3: Quickstep or Rumba
Week 4: Tango or Charleston
Week 5 – Halloween: Viennese Waltz, Jive, Paso Doble or Argentine Tango
Weeks 6 & 7: One unlearned dance from weeks 1–5
Week 8 – Blackpool: American Smooth or Samba
Week 9: One unlearned dance from weeks 1–8
Week 10 – Movie Night: One unlearned dance from weeks 1–8
Week 11 – Semi-final (Night 1): First unlearned dance from weeks 1–8 & Swing Marathon
Week 11 – Semi-final (Night 2): Second unlearned dance from weeks 1–8
Week 12 (Show 1): Highest scoring dance of the series & Showdance
Week 12 (Show 2): One unlearned dance from weeks 1–8 & couple's favourite dance of the series

TV ratings 
Weekly ratings for each show on BBC One. All numbers are in millions and provided by BARB

Professional partners 
Each year the professional dancers perform professional routines and dance to the special guest. With three new male professional dancers some of the professional pairings have changed again. The following professional partners danced with each other for the professional routines:

Anton du Beke & Erin Boag
Brendan Cole & Natalie Lowe
James Jordan & Ola Jordan
Vincent Simone & Flavia Cacace
Artem Chigvintsev & Katya Virshilas
Jared Murillo & Aliona Vilani
Robin Windsor & Kristina Rihanoff

Professional Dance Troupe 
Darren Bennett & Crystal Main
Ian Waite & Aneta Piotrowska
Shem Jacobs & Tanya Perera

The dances that the Dance Troupe have performed:

 Launch Show: Quickstep and Jive to "Ballroom Blitz" by Sweet.
 Week 2: Quickstep to "Hey, Soul Sister" by Train.
 Week 5: Viennese Waltz to "Never Tear Us Apart" by INXS.
 Week 6: Rock 'n' Roll to "Rock 'n' Roll Is Here to Stay" by Danny and the Juniors, "Roll Over Beethoven" by Chuck Berry, "Shake, Rattle And Roll" by Bill Haley.
 Week 7: Paso Doble to "Radio" by Alesha Dixon (in front of live artist).
 Week 10: ABBA Medley to "Mamma Mia", "Lay All Your Love on Me", "Take a Chance on Me".
 Week 11: Paso Doble to "Fire With Fire" by Scissor Sisters.

Celebrity performances 
Each week various celebrities perform on the results show, often accompanied by some of the professional couples.

Week 1: Robbie Williams & Gary Barlow – "Shame"
Week 2: Robbie Williams – "Rock DJ"
Week 3: Peter Andre – "Defender"
Week 4: Neil Diamond – "Midnight Train to Georgia"
Week 5: Alice Cooper – "Poison" (Halloween special)
Week 6: Bryan Ferry – "You Can Dance"
Week 7: Annie Lennox – "Universal Child" & Alesha Dixon – "Radio"
Week 8: Duffy – "Well, Well, Well"
Week 9: James Blunt – "So Far Gone"
Week 10: Manic Street Preachers – "Some Kind of Nothingness"
Week 11: Take That – "The Flood" & "Back for Good"
Week 12: Paloma Faith – "Upside Down"

References

External links 

Season 08
2010 British television seasons